Eva Röse (born 16 October 1973) is a Swedish actress and television host. She is best known internationally for her role as the sinister android Niska in Season 1 of the Swedish science fiction TV series Real Humans. Since 2022, she is the President of the Republic of Jamtland.

Biography 
Röse was born in Skärholmen, Stockholm, and began acting as a child at Vår teater, a children's theater in Stockholm.

Röse started, together with Alice Bah Kuhnke and Johan Petersson, as a presenter for Sveriges Television's  and then studied at the Swedish National Academy of Mime and Acting. She graduated in 1998 and has had roles in films as well as at the Royal Dramatic Theatre and Stockholm City Theatre. She was appointed UNICEF Goodwill Ambassador in 2007.

Röse has also been an emcee and awards presenter at a number of cultural events, including the August Prize ceremony and the Stockholm International Film Festival. In 2016, she was the main character in one of the episodes of Sveriges Television's version of Who Do You Think You Are?. Among other things, it was revealed that she is related to actress Bibi Andersson and that her grandfather made his living whaling in Antarctica.

In 2018, she was awarded the Carl Åkermark Prize.

In 2022, Röse was elected President of the Republic of Jamtland, a semi-fictitious micronation within the Kingdom of Sweden.

Röse is married and has four children with photographer and musician Jacob Felländer.

Filmography
Adam & Eva (1997), One of Tove's girl friends
Längtans blåa blomma (1998), Beata 'Betty' Tollman
Magnetisörens femte vinter (1999), Sofie
Blå Måndag (2001), Eva Lindgren
Me and Morrison (2001), Sophie
Kopps (2003), Jessica
Villmark (2003), Elin
Storm (2006), Lova
Att göra en pudel (2006), Rita
Göta Kanal 2 (2006), Petra Andersson
Rallybrudar (2008), Ulla
Sthlm (2008)
Maria Wern (TV series) (2008-2016)
Göta kanal 3 (2009), Petra
Submission (2010), Herself – documentary by Stefan Jarl
Real Humans (TV-series, 2012)
The Paradise Suite (2015)
Heder

References

External links

1973 births
Living people
People from Varberg
Swedish film actresses
Swedish television actresses
Swedish television hosts
UNICEF Goodwill Ambassadors
20th-century Swedish actresses
21st-century Swedish actresses
Swedish women television presenters